Aldercar High School is a coeducational secondary school and sixth form located in Aldercar, Derbyshire, England.

It is close to the A610 and Langley Mill Academy, and is next door to Aldercar Infants School.

Admissions
The school's catchment area includes Aldercar, Langley Mill and Heanor. Students from Ilkeston, Eastwood, Codnor and Ripley also attend. As of 2021, the school had around 600 students.

History
The school opened in September 1955 as a secondary modern school. It became Heanor Aldercar Comprehensive School, then Aldercar School. The school has been awarded specialist Language College status, and was named Aldercar Community Language College for a time before being renamed Aldercar High School.

In 2009, the Phoenix Centre Sixth Form building opened, offering courses for ages 16–19.

Previously a community school administered by Derbyshire County Council, in October 2022 Aldercar High School converted to academy status. The school is now sponsored by the Embark Multi Academy Trust.

Notable former pupils
Ron Haslam, world champion motorcycle racer
Paris Simmons, footballer
Nick Wright, footballer
Paul Reece, footballer
Chanel Cresswell, actress

References 

 Department for Children, Schools and Families School Verification
 Aldercar, the Story of a School, Mary and John Sheppard, December 2006,

External links
 Aldercar High School
 Searching for knives in October 2007
 Deputy head attacked by pupils from Eastwood School in December 2005
 Designing school uniforms in March 2002
 EduBase

Secondary schools in Derbyshire
Academies in Derbyshire